NahemaH was a Spanish heavy metal band from Alicante, Spain, that was formed in 1997. Since then, they have released four albums. Nahemah released their two final albums via Lifeforce Records.

History
Nahemah was formed in 1997 in Alicante, Spain. In 1999, their debut album, Edens in Communion, was independently released. In 2001, being signed to Iberian Moon Records, Nahemah released their second album, Chrysalis. The album received positive feedback and was re-released by Concreto Records. Nahemah also were an opening act for bands such as Moonspell and Alastis.

During 2003, Nahemah recorded an EP titled The Last Human, which remains unreleased. Following the recording of the unreleased EP, the band had line-up problems.

Between 2003 and 2005, the band was putting together their third studio album, The Second Philosophy. That album would see a release in 2007 via Lifeforce Records, a label which they were signed to in August 2006. In 2009, Nahemah released their fourth studio album A New Constellation, also, via the label Lifeforce Records.

In August 2012, Nahemah announced via their official website that they have disbanded.

Line-up

Final members
Pablo Egido - vocals (1997-2012)
Paco Porcel - bass (1997-2012)
Miguel Palazón - guitar, synths (1997-2012)
Roberto Marco - guitar (1997-2012)
Enrique Pérez - drums (2009-2012)

Former members
José Diego - drums (1997-2007)
Quino Jiménez - drums (2007)
Syhobsh - drums (2007-2009)
Henry Saiz - bass (2001-2002)

Discography

Albums
 Edens in Communion (Independent, 1999)
 Chrysalis (Iberian Moon Records, 2001) (re-released by Concreto Records in 2002)
 The Second Philosophy (Lifeforce Records, 2007)
 A New Constellation (Lifeforce Records, 2009)

References

Musical groups established in 1997
Symphonic black metal musical groups
Spanish death metal musical groups
Spanish melodic death metal musical groups
Spanish gothic metal musical groups
Spanish symphonic metal musical groups
Spanish black metal musical groups
Progressive metal musical groups
Musical quintets
Musical groups disestablished in 2012